Juan Adelarpe Alonso (13 December 1927 – 8 September 1994), sometimes called Juanito Alonso, was a Spanish footballer who played as a goalkeeper for Real Madrid and was part of their European Cup victories in 1956, 1957 and 1958. He earned 2 caps for the Spain national football team. Alonso won the Ricardo Zamora Trophy during the 1954–55 season. At the end of his career he played a few matches for Real Madrid's second team, which then played under the name AD Plus Ultra in the second division.

Honours

Club
Real Madrid
 4 Spanish League: 1953–54, 1954–55, 1956–57, 1957–58
 5 European Cup: 1955–56, 1956–57, 1957–58, 1958–59, 1959–60

Individual
 1 Zamora Trophy: 1954–55

External links
 
 National team data 
 
 Real Madrid profile 
 Porteros vascos de leyenda 

1927 births
1994 deaths
People from Hondarribia
Spanish footballers
Footballers from the Basque Country (autonomous community)
Association football goalkeepers
La Liga players
CD Logroñés footballers
Racing de Ferrol footballers
Real Madrid CF players
Spain B international footballers
Spain international footballers
Sportspeople from Gipuzkoa
UEFA Champions League winning players